North Schell Peak is the highest mountain in the Schell Creek Range of White Pine County, Nevada, United States. It is the ninth-highest mountain in the state, and also ranks as the fifth-most topographically prominent peak in the state.

See also
 List of Ultras of the United States

References

External links
 
 

Mountains of Nevada
Mountains of White Pine County, Nevada
Humboldt–Toiyabe National Forest